Abdul Aziz is a Bangladesh Awami League politician and the incumbent Member of Parliament of Sirajganj-3.

Career
Aziz was elected to parliament from Sirajganj-3 as a Bangladesh Awami League candidate 30 December 2018.

References

Awami League politicians
Living people
11th Jatiya Sangsad members
Year of birth missing (living people)